Joachim Pirsch (26 October 1914 – 25 August 1988) was a German rower who competed in the 1936 Summer Olympics.

In 1936 he won the silver medal with his partner Willi Kaidel in the Olympic double sculls competition.

References

External links
 Database Olympics profile

1914 births
1988 deaths
Olympic rowers of Germany
Rowers at the 1936 Summer Olympics
Olympic silver medalists for Germany
Olympic medalists in rowing
German male rowers
Medalists at the 1936 Summer Olympics
European Rowing Championships medalists